Guadalupe Guerrero is the Superintendent of Portland Public Schools in Oregon.

In 1992, Guerrero earned a BA degree in History at UCLA. He later earned two master's degrees from Harvard University, one in School Leadership and Principal Certification and one in Educational Policy and Management.  Guerrero's first position was as a bilingual elementary school teacher in San Francisco. He was principal of Dever Elementary in Dorchester, Boston from 2002 until 2008, a school the Boston Post described as a "school in crisis" in 2002. While principal, he introduced a new math curriculum, and increased outreach to parents. However, in 2008, just 8 percent of fourth graders attained were proficient in math, with similar results in English proficiency. While  in Boston, he also worked as a "cluster leader," training other principals. In 2008, he began a doctorate at the Harvard School of Education, but was terminated from the program in 2014 when he failed to finish his dissertation. In 2010, he became assistant superintendent of the San Francisco Unified School District, working out of Mission High School to better connect with schools in his target area. He held the post for two years. In 2012, he became Deputy Superintendent of instruction, innovation and social justice in the San Francisco Unified School District. He applied for the superintendent position of the Boston public schools in 2015, but was not hired.

Guerrero was appointed Superintendent of Portland Public Schools on August 11, 2017. He announced at a press conference that he would focus on equity, supporting struggling schools, and preparing students to graduate. In October 2017, Guerrero proposed to disperse ACCESS Academy, a school specifically for highly gifted students, whose needs cannot met by neighborhood schools, between eight neighborhood schools. This plan was met with criticism, including student protests at both the PPS central office and at the Rose City Park School, causing Guerrero to apologize for not having "co-constructed a conversation" with ACCESS families. In December 2017, Guerrero also proposed he would relocate students at Pioneer, a school for children with behavior problems and disabilities, which was met with further protest. Guerrero subsequently backed off this plan as well, and on May 30, 2018 (notably, one week before the end of the school year), Guerrero and the school board voted to split the school in half, situating grades 1-5 at Vestal Elementary School and grades 6-8 seven miles away at Lane Middle School. This move was promised to be "temporary," and Guerrero and the school board gave assurances that reuniting ACCESS Academy would be a priority in their next round of school balancing.

References

External links 
 Portland Public Schools' biography of Guadalupe Guerrero

Living people
Year of birth missing (living people)
Portland Public Schools (Oregon)
American educators
Harvard Graduate School of Education alumni
University of California, Los Angeles alumni
School superintendents in Oregon